Gulbara Kalieva is the deputy head of the Supreme Court of Kyrgyzstan.

References

Living people
Year of birth missing (living people)
Place of birth missing (living people)
Kyrgyzstani lawyers
Judiciary of Kyrgyzstan